Statistics of Japanese Regional Leagues for the 1989 football season.

Champions list

League standings

Hokkaido

Tohoku

Kanto

Hokushinetsu

Tokai

Kansai

Chugoku

Shikoku

Kyushu

1989
Jap
Jap
3